Two ships of the Royal Fleet Auxiliary have borne the name RFA Fort Rosalie:

  was a stores ship launched in 1944 and scrapped in 1973 
She is in service as of 2009.

Royal Fleet Auxiliary ship names